Euonymus indicus, the Indian spindle tree, is a small evergreen understorey tree endemic to the Western Ghats of the Indian peninsula and belongs to the family Celestraceae. It can grow up to a height of 13 m and girth up to 1 m.

Description 
The leaves are simple and show opposite phyllotaxy. The petiole length is about 0.5-0.8 cm and lamina size: 5-10 × 2-4.5 cm. Leaf shape is elliptic and leaf apex is acuminate. Four to six pairs of secondary nerves can be seen. Flowers are seen in three flowered axillary cymes. Fruit is pear shaped, 2.5 cm long, three valved, and scarlet when mature.

The bark of the tree is corky and blaze is reddish in colour. The branchlets are subterate and glabrous.

Distribution 
The tree is seen in the evergreen forests of Western Ghats from Amboli to Southern Kerala. Elevation range is from 150 m to 1100 m.

References 

indicus

Flora of Kerala